Trucheosaurus is an extinct genus of rhytidosteid temnospondyl from the Late Permian period of the Sydney Basin, New South Wales, Australia. It is known from the holotype materials MMF 12697a, a partially complete skull, AMF 50977, an articulated postcranial skeleton and BMNHR 3728, the counterpart of both skull and postcranial skeleton, recovered from the Glen Davis Formation. This genus was named by Watson in 1956, and the type species is Trucheosaurus major.

Phylogeny 
Below is a cladogram from Dias-da-Silva and Marsicano (2011):

References

Permian temnospondyls
Prehistoric amphibians of Australia
Paleontology in New South Wales
Fossil taxa described in 1956